Agalychnis callidryas, commonly known as the red-eyed tree frog, is a species of frog in the subfamily Phyllomedusinae. It is native to forests from  Central America to north-western South America. This species is known for its bright coloration, namely its vibrant green body with blue and yellow stripes on the side. It has a white underside, brightly red and orange colored feet, and is named after its distinctive bright red eyes.

Agalychnis callidryas is an arboreal frog with long limbs and webbed toes. They mate and reproduce near ponds, and are therefore found in lowland wet areas found in tropical forests.

Like all the frogs in its genus, they are nocturnal and do most of their hunting for insects at night. The males of this species are smaller than the females, and they display non-random mating patterns which suggest female choice for specific types of male. 
Despite its bright coloration, the red-eyed tree frog is not poisonous. Its bright coloration can thus be more attributed to camouflage amongst the greenery of the surrounding jungle, as well as the “startle reflex,” which it can use to dissuade predators. During the day, the frog uses its green back to camouflage amongst the leaves, this camouflage being its only defense. If disturbed, the frog flashes its bright red eyes, which may startle predators and allow the frog to escape. 

Along with its visual appearance, phenotypic plasticity in hatching is another interesting feature of A. callidryas. If faced with the vibrational cues associated with predators, A. callidryas embryos may hatch early and fall into the water to escape predation. This response is extremely specific, and mostly occurs only at vibrational patterns associated with predators. These frogs have a distinct temperature requirement and need a body of water to reproduce, and are thus only found in humid lowlands and rainforests of South and Central America.

Description

Agalychnis callidryas is an easily recognizable species due to its colorful appearance. In terms of size, males reach about 2 inches while females grow to 3 inches and are the larger of the two. Adult individuals are distinctively colored, with bright green bodies, light blue or cream colored bellies, and blue and yellow stripes along their sides. Their feet are bright orange and have suction cups which help them adhere to the bottom of leaves where they spend most of their time. Their skin is smooth with little to no bumps, another feature which helps the frog blend into their leafy surroundings. An impressive feature is their bright red colored eyes with vertical slits. They do not have a true eyelid, but rather a nictitating membrane that allows light to enter the eye so that they will awaken when predators are approaching. 

The frog's coloration is representative of “flash coloration.” Flash coloration describes when an organism displays certain colors at rest compared to when in motion. In the red-eyed tree frog’s case, the frog’s startling red eyes are hidden when its eyes are closed allowing it to blend in with leaves. When the frog is startled, it can flash its bright red eyes, orange webbed feet, and blue and yellow lateral stripes, which all serve the purpose of startling predators and allowing the frog time to escape. Although the frog is brightly colored, this does not confer toxicity or aposematism like it may in related tree frog species.

Distribution of color morphs
Though the main coloring of Agalychnis callidryas is consistent, there are some variations in morphs across the geographical range of the species. Red-eyed tree frogs have variation in the color of their side stripes, which in Costa Rica and Panama specifically includes blue, blue/red, orange and purple. There are several hypotheses for the reason behind the existence of these color morphs. One strong hypothesis is that the existence of orange and purple morphs in Costa Rica are caused by isolation by distance, because the orange and purple morphs were not genetically distinct groups. It is possible that color patterns have been affected by different selective pressures, and that the existence of some morphs are due to genetic drift.

Synapomorphies
As a species of tree frog, Agalychnis callidryas has a claw shaped terminal phalanx. Other synapomorphies of this genus include the presence of a red hue on the iris and a golden reticulated palpebral membrane.

Distribution and habitat 
Agalychnis callidryas is native to Central America, from northeastern Honduras to northern Colombia.

Its natural habitats include inland forests and wetlands, both tropical and mountainous areas where there is forest cover and water nearby. Ponds or bodies of water are essential in its reproduction so they are always found near these areas. The red-eyed tree frog is commonly found in tropical rainforests in the previously listed countries. The frog is primarily arboreal, and prefers hiding in canopy cover amongst leaves. Agalychnis callidryas require high humidity levels of at least 80%.

Behaviour and ecology

Diet 
Adult red-eyed tree frogs are primarily carnivores, eating crickets, moths, grasshoppers, flies, and other insects. Occasionally, they also eat smaller amphibians. Tadpoles eat plants, algae, plankton, bacteria, and carrion. After metamorphosis, froglets begin consuming small insects like fruit flies and pinhead crickets. A study on carotenoids consumption has shown they play an important role in development, phenotype, and fecundity.  There is a critical window after metamorphosis where carotenoids improve female growth rate and fecundity, and lead to a redder skin in both sexes. Carotenoids are important nutrients for wild red-eyed tree frogs and especially for captive red-eyed tree frogs, who sometimes suffer skin pigmentation degradation due to an inadequate diet.

Reproduction and life cycle 

Red-eyed tree frogs mate seasonally, specifically in the rainy season during the months of October to March. Males attract females by croaking and wrestle with each other in male-male competition in order to gain access to females for reproduction. Females latch on to the underside of a leaf using the suction cup like structures on their webbed feet, and the female must hold on to the leaf while males compete and wrestle nearby. The winning male and female will then participate in amplexus, and the female will lay eggs on the underside of the leaf as they are fertilized by the male. The eggs typically hatch within 6 to 7 days if left undisturbed. This process occurs above or very close to a body of water, because tadpoles which hatch from the eggs will drop into water from the leaf. Eggs will hatch early if their survival is threatened, in a process called phenotypic plasticity. The female chooses a leaf above a pond or large puddle on which to lay her clutch of roughly 40 eggs. Since oviposition generally occurs on both sides of a leaf, red-eyed tree frogs may fold the leaf to hide the eggs from predators. They also produce sticky jelly to glue the eggs together; this may protect the eggs from splitting and dehydration.

Life cycle 
Following fertilization, females lay clutches of about 40 eggs, and can lay multiple clutches in a single night. Since the eggs are often adhered to a leaf above water, tadpoles fall into the water below as soon as they hatch. Eggs will usually hatch 6-8 days after they have been laid, with some variation depending on geography and risk assessment through vibration. Depending on environmental conditions, the tadpoles will then stay in the water for a few weeks or months. They will change to adult colors following metamorphosis, and live for about five years in the wild. 

Red-eyed tree frog embryos use natural day and night light cycles as a signal for when to hatch, and tend to hatch just after nightfall. Red-eyed tree frog eggs may hatch early (exhibiting phenotypic plasticity) when a change in the environment signals a danger to their survival. Dragonflies, fish, and water beetles prey on the tadpoles. The tadpoles remain in the water from three weeks to several months, until they metamorphose into frogs. The time of metamorphosis depends on duration of larval stage, which varies depending on environment. After metamorphosis, the color of tadpoles' torsos changes from green to brown, and their eyes, which are initially yellow, turn into deep red without much side patterning. These changes mark maturity. The lifespan of red-eyed tree frogs is about five years.

Mating 
Red-eyed tree frogs females are typically choosy about which males they mate with. Females will choose mates based on visual and auditory clues, mainly the male frogs’ croaking calls as well as their size and flank stripe. Females are likely to choose males with “local” flank stripes and call patterns, meaning that male frogs from nearby areas are selected for in mating. Call and stripe patterns are considered simultaneously by females in this situation. 
Size plays a role in mate choice for red-eyed tree frogs as well. Often larger males are more successful in amplexus compared to smaller males. However, size-assortative mating also plays a role and larger females are more likely to pair with proportionally large males and vice versa for small females and males. This is so the male can successfully fertilize the female’s eggs during amplexus. 

During the mating season, the male frogs shake the branches where they are sitting to improve their chances of finding a mate by keeping rivals at bay. This is the first evidence that tree-dwelling vertebrates use vibration to communicate. When rainfall is at its highest, a male red-eyed tree frog calls "chack" to get the attention of the female. Females use the call, as well as color (specifically, the stripped sides) of the male frog, in order to find a possible mate. Both the call and color of the male frog show territorial display, and anti-predatory behavior. During amplexus, the female carries the male on her back for several hours during the oviposition process. Because of external egg fertilization, there is still risk of competition even after a female has selected a mate. There is not sperm priority in Agalychnis callidryas, and so a single clutch of eggs may have been fertilized by multiple males.

Phenotypic plasticity 

Red-eyed tree frogs' embryos exhibit phenotypic plasticity, hatching early in response to disturbance to protect themselves. Though embryos are bred synchronously, they normally hatch after 6 to 10 days from oviposition without disturbance. However, a simultaneously early hatching in entire clutches is triggered when embryos are exposed to their predators or threatening environmental changes such as rainstorm and flood. Early hatching has also been linked with egg dehydration, hatching earlier in dry egg clutches than in wet ones.

Hatching early is an important defense to predators, but is also a risky strategy for embryos because early hatching increases predation risk in water. Therefore, to maximize the benefits of this strategy embryos must only hatch when they are truly at risk by a predator. Studies show that this strategy is multifaceted and a specific combination of vibrational pulse duration and inter-pulse intervals is needed in order for embryos to exhibit this response. This combination of pulse duration and inter-pulse intervals is thought to be specific to the embryo predators, thus ensuring the response only occurs when absolutely necessary to ensure survival. 

Predators are the major cause of this response. Since these frogs usually lay eggs on both the upper and the undersides of leaves above ponds, clutches need to protect themselves against arboreal, aerial and aquatic predators, such as snakes, dragonflies, fish, monkeys, and pathogenic fungi. When predators are close enough to produce detectable vibration, the embryos assess disturbance. After a few seconds, embryos vigorously hatch out into tadpoles and spread out to escape. Since eggs are usually laid above ponds, the response improves survival because tadpoles often fall into water on hatching. Hatching direction also has implications on embryo survival. Embryos often hatch and fall into the water, but hatching direction may also be influenced by light. A study found that A. callidryas embryos hatch towards light, suggesting they use light and dark as directional cues to determine hatching direction.

Conservation
As of 2016, the red-eyed tree frog is classified as being of least concern. While the population is decreasing, and inhabits many areas vulnerable to deforestation, the classification of “least concern” stems from its general tolerance to habitat modification, a wide species distribution, and presumably large captive population. The red-eyed tree frog’s husbandry, care, and breeding knowledge have been greatly improved upon in the 21st century. However, as with all frogs and toads, the species still faces challenges from chytrid fungus, logging, residential development, and pollution.

References

External links

 Red-Eyed Tree Frog Facts
 Honolulu Zoo: Red-eyed Tree Frog
 Red-Eyed Tree Frog Care Information at Caresheets.net
 Red Eyed Tree Frog Care at RedEyedTreeFrog.org
 A mass mating event of Red Eyed Green Frogs at La Selva Biological Field Station, Costa Rica
 Red-Eyed Tree Frog Care Guide

callidryas
Amphibians described in 1862
Amphibians of Belize
Amphibians of Colombia
Amphibians of Costa Rica
Amphibians of Guatemala
Amphibians of Honduras
Amphibians of Mexico
Amphibians of Nicaragua
Amphibians of Panama